The San Francisco Old Mint half eagle was a commemorative coin which was issued by the United States Mint in 2006.

Legislation
The San Francisco Old Mint Commemorative Coins Act authorized the production of the coin, along with a silver dollar, to mark the centennial of the building's survival of the 1906 San Francisco earthquake and fire. The so-called "Granite Lady" was also viewed as instrumental in helping the city recover from the disaster. The act allowed the coins to be struck in both proof and uncirculated finishes. The coins were released on August 15, 2006.

Designs
The obverse of the coin, designed by Charles Vickers, portrays the portico of the San Francisco Mint, based on an 1869 construction drawing by Supervising Architect A.B. Mullet. The reverse of the coin, designed by Joseph Menna, is based on Christian Gobrecht’s 1906 Coronet Liberty half eagle reverse.

Specifications
 Display Box Color: Dark Blue
 Edge: Reeded
 Weight: 8.359 grams; 0.2687 troy ounce
 Diameter: 21.59 millimeters; 0.850 inch
 Composition: 90% Gold, 10% Silver

See also

 United States commemorative coins
 List of United States commemorative coins and medals (2000s)

References

Coins of the United States dollar
Gold coins